Zodia rutilella is a moth of the family Choreutidae. It is known from Brazil.

References

Choreutidae